Beatriz Haddad Maia defeated Alison Riske in the final, 6–4, 1–6, 6–3 to win the women's singles tennis title at the 2022 Nottingham Open. It was her first WTA Tour singles title, and she became the first Brazilian to win a WTA Tour title on grass since Maria Bueno in 1968.

Johanna Konta was the defending champion but she retired from professional tennis in December 2021.

Seeds

Draw

Finals

Top half

Bottom half

Qualifying

Seeds

Qualifiers

Draw

First qualifier

Second qualifier

Third qualifier

Fourth qualifier

Fifth qualifier

Sixth qualifier

References

External links
 Draws

2022 WTA Tour
2022 Nottingham Open - Women's 1